Hinode Barueri is a women's volleyball team, based in Barueri, São Paulo (state), Brazil.

History
The women's volleyball team was founded in 2016, and finished the 2017 Paulista Championship (São Paulo State Championship) in second, losing to Osasco Voleibol Clube. The team played the main division of the Brazilian Women's Volleyball Superliga for the first time in the season 2017/2018 and finished in fifth place.

Team
Season 2019-2020 squad - As of October 2019

Head coach:  José Roberto Guimarães

Titles
 Paulista Championship:
 Runners-Up (1): 2017

References

External links

Brazilian volleyball clubs